The 2020–21 season is the 71st season of competitive association football played by Dynamo Dresden, a professional football club who play their home matches at the Rudolf-Harbig-Stadion in Dresden, Saxony, Germany. Their 18th-place finish in the 2019–20 season meant that it would be the clubs first season in the third-tier of German football, the 3. Liga, since the 2015–16 season.

Background
The 2019–20 season saw Dynamo Dresden finish bottom of the 2. Bundesliga on 32 points and were thus relegated to the 3. Liga. Markus Kauczinski retains his role from the previous season despite relegation, having been appointed in December 2019. It was originally planned for the 3. Liga season to begin on 24 July 2020, though as a result of the COVID-19 pandemic, the beginning of the 2020–21 season was delayed until 18 September 2020.

Season summary
After mixed results in pre-season friendlies, Dynamo saw a strong start to their season with wins against first round DFB-Pokal opponent Hamburger SV, a 2. Bundesliga side, and 1. FC Kaiserslautern, but subsequently struggled, losing four of the following eight games. Results improved after a 2–1 home victory over TSV 1860 Munich in round 10, however, with Dynamo going on an eight-game-long lossless streak. A goalless draw against KFC Uerdingen 05 in round 14 made them league leaders, and Dynamo would go on to lose only two more league games until March 2021, although they dropped out of the DFB-Pokal after a 0–3 second round loss against SV Darmstadt 98 on 22 December 2020.

Having now spent much of the season as the league's comfortable leader, things took a sudden turn for the worse when, in late March and April 2021, Dynamo lost three out of four league games in a row, culminating in a 0–3 home loss against Hallescher FC, at the time a team located firmly in the second half of the table. The situation was further complicated by the occurrence of several COVID-19 cases in the team, leading to quarantine periods and the rescheduling of several league games; round 34 was played before rounds 32 and 33. Following the loss against Halle and a sudden drop from the league's top position, head coach Markus Kauczinski was sacked and replaced by Alexander Schmidt on 25 April. Schmidt was able to reverse the team's fortunes immediately, winning five of the remaining six games without conceding a single goal, thus regaining the top position soon after his installation. Dynamo ultimately won the league four points ahead of FC Hansa Rostock and was promoted to the 2. Bundesliga.

Players

First-team squad

Transfers

Transfers in

Loans in

Transfers out

Loans out

Friendly matches

Competitions

Overview

3. Liga

League table

Results summary

Results by round

Matches

DFB-Pokal

Saxony Cup

Player statistics

Appearances and goals

Notes

References

Dynamo Dresden seasons
Dynamo Dresden